Sinowatsonia mussoti is a moth in the family Erebidae. It was described by Charles Oberthür in 1903. It is found in Sichuan and Tibet in China.

References

Moths described in 1903
Spilosomina